Rasika Dugal is an Indian actress. She is known for her roles in several Indian movies and television shows.

She made her screen debut with a small role, in the film Anwar (2007). And then she went on to star in many critically acclaimed films namely No Smoking (2007), Aurangzeb (2013), Qissa (2015), Train Station (2015), Tu Hai Mera Sunday (2017), Hamid (2018), etc. In 2018, she was seen in the biographical movie Manto based on the life of writer Saadat Hassan Manto, where she essayed the role of Safia, Manto's wife, for which she garnered her first Screen Award nomination in the category of Best Supporting Actress. Then in 2020, she appeared in movies like Lootcase and Darbaan, her performances in both of which were praised. In addition to films, Dugal is also active in the television industry. She has appeared in many television serials, such as Powder (2010), Kismat (2010), Upanishad Ganga (2012), and P.O.W.- Bandi Yuddh Ke (2016).

Rasika's breakthrough came in the year 2018 with her role in the Amazon Prime Video original series Mirzapur, for which she earned a nomination in Indian Television Academy Awards in the category of Best Actress in a web series. Since then, she has received critical appraisal for multiple web series, including Made in Heaven (2019), Delhi Crime (2019), Out of Love (2019-2021), A Suitable Boy (2020), and OK Computer (2021). In 2020, she co-wrote a short film with her husband (Mukul Chadda) titled Banana Bread. She also did a comic podcast named Uncovidable (2020), which was created by Vekeana Dhillon. It is available on the platform Audible.

Early life and education
Rasika Dugal was born in Circuit House Area, Jamshedpur, Jharkhand to Jessie Dugal and Raveen Dugal. She attained a Bachelor of Science degree in mathematics in the year 2004 from Lady Shri Ram College for Women, Delhi. Subsequently, Dugal attended Sophia Polytechnic for a postgraduate diploma in Social Communications Media and FTII for attaining a  postgraduate diploma in acting.

Career

Early roles, career struggles (2007-2014)

Rasika started appearing in Bollywood movies since 2007. She first appeared in the film Anwar (2007) in a small role. Then she appeared in many films but in a small role namely No Smoking (2007), Hijack (2008), Tahaan (2008), Agyaat (2009), Kshay (2011), Aurangzeb (2013), etc. With working in films, she was also doing television shows like Powder (2010), Rishta.com (2010), Kismat (2010), and Upanishad Ganga (2012). None of her roles, whether in films or in television failed to leave an impact.

Critical acclaim (2015-2017)

Then in 2015, she starred in critically acclaimed film Qissa in the role of Neeli. The film received praise from critics as well as the audience. The critic's consensus was "A masterpiece that lovers of parallel cinema would thoroughly enjoy. This unconventional and heart-breaking folk tale captures human emotions unlike any other recent Indian film." She also did a Malayalam language film Kammatti Paadam (2016), starring Dulquer Salmaan in lead. She also played a recurring role in Barun Sobti starrer Tu Hai Mera Sunday (2016).

She also appeared in television series like Dariba Dairies (2015) in the role of Zeenat Bano and P.O.W.- Bandi Yuddh Ke (2016) in the role of Shobha Thakur. Then in 2016, she turned host on the show Devlok with Devdutt Pattanaik. She also appeared in The Viral Fever web shows like Permanent Roommates (2016), Humorously Yours (2016-2019), and TVF Couples (2017).

Recognition and commercial success (2018-present)

Then in 2018, she did a small appearance in the Netflix anthology film Lust Stories in Zoya Akhtar's segment. Then she appeared in Nandita Das's biographical movie Manto (2018). The movie was about the life of playwright Saadat Hasan Manto, Rasika played the role of his wife Safia. Her performance was praised by the critics, for which she received her first nomination at the Screen Awards in the category of Best Supporting Actress. After Manto, she appeared in the critically acclaimed film Hamid (2018) co-starring Vikas Kumar and Talha Arshad Reshi, directed by Aijaz Khan. The film won many accolades including National Film Award for Best Feature Film in Urdu at the 66th National Film Awards and Rasika Dugal won the Best Actor Award for her role in the film Hamid at Rajasthan International Film Festival.

Then in November 2018, she starred in the Amazon Prime Video original series Mirzapur. She portrayed the role of Beena Tripathi. For her role in Mirzapur, she was nominated in the Indian Television Academy Awards in the category of Best Actress - Web Series. She also appeared in an episode of Zoya Akhtar's web series Made in Heaven, she portrayed the role of Nutan Yadav, the daughter of an ambitious politician willing to sacrifice his daughter's dreams for his political career. The show was released on Amazon Prime on 8 March 2019.

Subsequently, she played the main role in Hotstar original series Out of Love (2019-2021), She played the role of Dr. Meera Kapoor. The show was renewed for a second season, it was released on 21 May 2021. She portrayed the role of a young IPS officer named Neeti Singh in the TV series Delhi Crime released on Netflix on 21 March 2019 which won the International Emmy Award for Best Drama Series. She also starred in supporting roles in web series such as A Suitable Boy (2020) and OK Computer (2021). In 2020, her two films were released namely Lootcase and Darbaan. In both of the films, her performance was praised by the critics. She also did a podcast titled Uncovidable (2020) which was released on Audible. It was created by Vekeana Dhillon.

Rasika was roped in for an international comedy audio series The Empire written by Anuvab Pal. She will be next seen in Srijit Mukherji's directorial Sherdil, the film also stars Neeraj Kabi and Pankaj Tripathi in key roles.

Personal life
In 2010, Rasika Dugal married fellow actor Mukul Chadda after dating for 3 years. 

She enjoys reading Urdu poetry, learning music, and listening to podcasts. 

She currently resides in Mumbai.

Filmography

Films

Television

Web series

Podcast

Short films

Awards and nominations

See also 

 Pankaj Tripathi
 Vikrant Massey
 Shriya pilgaonkar

References

External links

 
 

Year of birth missing (living people)
Living people
Actresses from Jharkhand
Actresses from Mumbai
Actresses in Hindi cinema
People from Jamshedpur
Lady Shri Ram College alumni
Film and Television Institute of India alumni
Sophia Polytechnic alumni
Actresses in Malayalam cinema